This is a list of the heads of state of Malawi, from the independence of Malawi in 1964 to the present day.

From 1964 to 1966 the head of state under the Constitution of 1964 was the Queen of Malawi, Elizabeth II, who was also the Queen of the United Kingdom and the other Commonwealth realms. The monarch was represented in Malawi by a governor-general. Malawi became a republic within the Commonwealth under the Constitution of 1966 and the monarch and governor-general were replaced by an executive president.

Monarch (1964–1966)
The succession to the throne was the same as the succession to the British throne.

Governor-general
The governor-general was the representative of the monarch in Malawi and exercised most of the powers of the monarch. The governor-general was appointed for an indefinite term, serving at the pleasure of the monarch. Since Malawi was granted independence by the Malawi Independence Act 1964, rather than being first established as a semi-autonomous dominion and later promoted to independence as defined by the Statute of Westminster 1931, the governor-general was to be always appointed solely on the advice of the Cabinet of Malawi without the involvement of the British government. As Malawi became a republic before Glyn Jones, the former colonial governor, was replaced, this has never happened. In the event of a vacancy the chief justice would have served as the officer administering the government.

Status

President of Malawi
Under the country's 1966, 1994 and 1995 constitutions, the president is executive head of state.

The first president, Hastings Banda, was elected by the National Assembly and subsequently had himself declared president for life in 1970. He was defeated in 1994, a year after his life term was abolished as part of Malawi's transition to democracy. Since then, presidents have been elected in direct popular elections for a five-year term. Presidents may be elected any number of times, but not more than twice in a row. In the event of a vacancy, the vice-president becomes president for the balance of the term.

Standards

Notes

External links
 World Statesmen – Malawi
 Rulers.org – Malawi

Government of Malawi
H

Malawi